Pablo Sanz Martínez (born 9 April 1995) is a Spanish footballer who plays for SD Almazán as a forward.

Club career
Born in Soria, Castile and León, Sanz was a CD Numancia youth graduate. Promoted to the B-team in 2011, he made his senior debut during  the campaign, in the Tercera División.

Sanz scored his first senior goal on 1 November 2015, netting the last in a 3–1 away win against CD Mirandés B. He made his first-team debut on 15 April 2017, replacing Pablo Valcarce in a 3–1 away win against Elche CF in the Segunda División.

References

External links

1995 births
Living people
People from Soria
Sportspeople from the Province of Soria
Spanish footballers
Footballers from Castile and León
Association football forwards
Segunda División players
Tercera División players
Tercera Federación players
CD Numancia B players
CD Numancia players